The Brady Bunch Phonographic Album is the fourth and final studio album by American pop group the Brady Bunch. It was released on June 18, 1973, by Paramount Records. Original pressings of the album have the title Growing Up with the Brady Bunch on the disc labels. The gatefold album features art-deco stylized framed pictures of the kids in old-timey outfits.

In 1996, the album was released on CD for the first time with the addition of three bonus tracks from 1973's Chris Knight & Maureen McCormick.

Critical reception

In the June 30, 1973 issue, Billboard published a review which said: "TV's "other family" is a happy collective blending of rich harmonies and finely honed voices. This is an easy to take collection of pop tunes which will appeal to a specific audience which knows and enjoys this act. All the music is straight out in the open; there are no hidden messages or subliminal effects. Rather the instrumental sound of the orchestra is driving and as modern as can be developed. Producer Jackie Mills has skillfully handled all the components with an affection which is matched by arranger Al Capps who fires up the orchestra". The review noted "I'd Love You to Want Me", "A Simple Man", and "Parallel Lines" as the best cuts on the album, with a note to album dealers that "this act appeals to young kids who are loyal to the TV series and who come out in droves for their concerts".

Cashbox published a review in the July 7, 1973 issue that said: "Those bright eyed, bushy tailed, dimpled darlings from the TV series of the same name are back again with a wonderfully surprising album that should do much to further their career as music performers. Armed with an entourage of solid studio musicians supplying powerful background music, the Bunch delightfully prance through such good timey material as "Summer Breeze", "Charlotte's Web", "I'd Love You to Want Me", and their great "Zuckerman's Famous Pig" single. Classify this one as simply adorable. Check it out".

Commercial performance
The album and its singles did not appear on any music charts. Singles included Zuckerman's Famous Pig (PAA 0205) b/w Charlotte's Web and Everything I Do (PAA 0229) b/w I'd Love You to Want Me.

Track listing

Personnel
Adapted from the album liner notes.
 Al Capps – arrangements
 Barbara Casado – album design
 John Casado – album design
 Chris Knight – vocals
 Mike Lookinland – vocals
 Maureen McCormick – vocals
 Jackie Mills – producer
 Susan Olsen  – vocals
 Eve Plumb – vocals
 Albert Watson – photography
 Barry Williams – vocals

References

1973 albums
The Brady Bunch albums
Paramount Records (1969) albums